The 452d Flight Test Squadron is a United States Air Force squadron. It is assigned to the 412th Operations Group, Air Force Materiel Command, stationed at Edwards Air Force Base, California.

Overview
Currently, the squadron performs flight testing on Northrop Grumman RQ-4 Global Hawk unmanned aerial vehicles (UAV) used by the United States Air Force, NATO, Republic of Korea Air Force, and Japan Air Self-Defense Force.

History

World War II
Established as a B-26 Marauder medium bomber squadron in mid-1942; trained under Third Air Force in Florida. Deployed to European Theater of Operations (ETO), being assigned to VIII Bomber Command 3d Bombardment Wing in England. Engaged in attacks on enemy targets in France and the Low Countries; being reassigned to IX Bomber Command in 1943 with the establishment of Ninth Air Force in England. Also supported VIII Bomber Command strategic bombardment raids in Occupied Europe and Nazi Germany, attacking enemy airfields to disrupt interceptor attacks on heavy bomber formations and destroy enemy interceptor aircraft on the ground before they could be launched.

After D-Day deployed to Advanced Landing Grounds in France and later Belgium. Provided tactical air support and bombardment of enemy strong points and military targets to disrupt resistance to Allied ground forces advancing from the French invasion beaches and the ensuing offensives on the continent; 1944–1945. Attacked enemy forces as part of the Western Allied invasion of Germany, 1945 and continued offensive tactical operations in support of ground forces until German capitulation in May 1945.

Became part of the United States Air Forces in Europe army of occupation in Germany during 1945. Demobilized in place and personnel returned to the United States in the fall of 1945; squadron inactivated as an administrative unit in December 1945.

Cold War
Reactivated in the reserve in 1947 at Spaatz Field, Reading, Pennsylvania. Although classified as a Light Bombardment Squadron, was equipped with excess World War II advanced trainers. The Reserve Training Center at Reading was inactivated in 1949 due to funding reductions.

Reactivated by Tactical Air Command in 1954 as an F-86 Sabre day fighter squadron at Foster AFB, Texas. In 1955, the squadron was upgraded to the F-100 Super Sabre. Inactivated on 18 November 1957 in a budgetary economy move.

Reactivated in 1972 as an Air Training Command navigator training squadron; flew T-29; later T-43 navigation classroom aircraft. Concluded flight training in 1993 as part of the Cold War drawdown

Flight Testing

EC-18B Advanced Range Instrumentation Aircraft

Reactivated in 1994 at Edwards AFB, California as an EC-18B Advanced Range Instrumentation Aircraft test squadron, assuming the assets of the 4952d Test Squadron that was inactivated. The 4552d was established and activated on 1 July 1975 at Wright-Patterson AFB, Ohio and moved to Edwards AFB on 1 October 2000 along with its parent 4950th Test Wing. The squadron operated the unique, highly modified C-135 and C-18 aircraft to plan and execute DoD, NASA, and operational flight test programs. Missions supported include worldwide telemetry gathering, international treaty verification, spacecraft launches, ballistic missile defense, electronic combat and vulnerability analysis, aircraft icing tests, and aerial refueling certification.

On 30 June 1994 the 4950th was inactivated and its assets merged into the 412th Test Wing with the 452d FLTS taking over the EC-18 and EC/KC/NKC-135 fleet and mission. The 452d FLTS accomplished its primary mission using the Advanced Range Instrumentation Aircraft (ARIA) and the Cruise Missile Mission Control Aircraft (CMMCA). The ARIA, which originally stood for Apollo Range Instrumentation Aircraft, traveled the globe and serve as airborne tracking and telemetry data-recording and relay stations. They flew over land where ground tracking stations are limited by geographical constraints and over broad ocean areas where tracking stations do not exist. The unit supported a variety of national and international customers, both military and commercial, including NASA and Department of Defense missions supporting unmanned space launches, cruise missile tests, Army, Navy and Air Force ballistic missile tests and space shuttle launches.

Advanced Range Instrumentation Aircraft (ARIA)

Each ARIA aircraft had both external and internal modifications. Externally the most obvious difference in appearance from a standard C-135 or C-18 aircraft was the large, bulbous, "droop snoot" nose, a ten-foot radome which houses a seven-foot steerable dish antenna. The ARIA also has a probe antenna on each wing tip and a trailing wire antenna on the bottom of the fuselage (EC-l35E only) used for high frequency (HF) radio transmission and reception. Further external modifications include antennas for data retransmission via UHF satellite. The internal modifications to the cargo compartment included all of the instrumentation subsystems (Prime Mission Electronic Equipment - PMEE) installed in the form of a 30,000 pound modular package. Also provided are facilities for the crew members who operate the PMEE. The Prime Mission Electronic Equipment (PMEE) is organized into eight functional subsystems to provide the ARIA mission support capability.

The ARIA deployed throughout the world to obtain telemetry data from orbital and reentry vehicles as well as air-to-air and cruise missile tests. This includes support of tests conducted at Cape Canaveral AFS, Vandenberg AFB, Hill AFB, Eglin AFB, and from ships and submarines. Normally, the telemetry data was obtained in locations such as broad ocean areas and remote land areas which are outside the coverage of ground stations. Selected portions of the data was retransmitted in real time, via UHF satellite, to enable the launching agency to monitor system performance. All data was recorded on magnetic tape for post-mission analysis.

During orbital missions, ARIA shadowed the path of spacecraft for about 2,000 miles, recording about 9,200 feet of magnetic tape, which equals 15 minutes of data. Selected portions of information often were retransmitted in real time via UHF satellite to the launching agency so it could monitor the craft's performance. For re-entry missions, ARIA traced space vehicles during the last three minutes of flight: from the edge of space to impact. Two EC-18s were equipped with high-speed still and motion picture cameras capable of infrared and spectral photography, which aids in determining vehicle survivability.

 Cruise Missile Mission Control Aircraft (CMMCA)

The Cruise Missile Mission Control Aircraft mission was different from both orbital and reentry mission types, primarily due to the mission duration which may involve continuous automatic tracking for more than five hours. Other differences include: the vehicle flies below the ARIA; real-time data was relayed via L-band transmitters directly to ground stations; and voice was relayed via ARIA UHF radios between mission aircraft (launch, chase, photo, etc.) and mission control. ARIA also flies as the primary remote command & control / flight termination system for these missions.

These flights lasted longer than most, sometimes requiring five hours of continuous airborne tracking. If a missile accidentally veers off course or malfunctions, mission commanders could steer the device by remote control with an on-board joystick.

On a typical mission, flown locally from Edwards AFB, a B-52 launch aircraft with the cruise missile departed its home base several hours prior to the ARIA takeoff. The ARIA joins the B-52 and acquires telemetry from the missile at about launch minus 90 minutes. The B-52 and the trailing ARIA then proceed to the launch area. At this point, mission control uses the ARIA telemetry data to evaluate the missile's status. Prior to launch, F-16 chase and photo aircraft join the B-52 launch aircraft. After final checks are completed, the cruise missile is launched and the B-52 departs the area. The ARIA continues to track the missile after launch, receives and relays telemetry data from the missile, and relays UHF voice from the chase planes to mission control. The ARIA tracks the cruise missile until termination of the mission. During most tests, ARIA supplies the primary remote command & control / flight termination system (RCC/FTS) signal to the missile.

The CMMCA aircraft are divided into two groups: Phase 0 and Advanced CMMCA. The phase 0 CMMCA is used to monitor and control a cruise missile throughout its flight. The Cruise Missile Mission Control Aircraft (CMMCA) Phase 0 modification provides real-time telemetry displays and redundant RCC/FTS systems. The Advanced CMMCA provides the same capabilities as the CMMCA Phase 0 plus a tracking/surveillance radar for stand-alone operations as well as real-time data processing and display.

United States Naval use

As of June 2000 Navy instructor pilots were using EC-18B's from the 452nd Flight Test Squadron to train naval aircrews who operated E-6B Mercury aircraft. The E-6 provides communication links between national command authorities and U.S. strategic nuclear forces.

Cadre from the Navy's Fleet Air Reconnaissance Squadron 7, or VQ-7, at Tinker Air Force Base, Oklaholma, rotated to Edwards periodically to school student pilots and navigators aboard the EC-18s. Before flying five or six sorties at Edwards, students undergo numerous simulator "rides" at Tinker following initial aircrew training. After returning to Oklahoma, the made several actual E-6 flights before graduating from the program and joining the fleet to support U.S. Strategic Command at Offut Air Force Base, Nebraska. VQ-7 was using 452d aircraft because one of its two aging trainers, a TC-18, was grounded after an FAA-mandated inspection. Looking for quick replacements, VQ-7 discovered the 452d flies aircraft built on the same aircraft, a Boeing 707, as their TC-18. And with the EC-18B Advanced Range Instrumentation Aircraft not flying as frequently as in the past, there was a readily available product for the Navy's immediate need.

Phasedown

On 10 February 1998 the annual Force Structure Announcement formalized adjustments to the aircraft fleet at Edwards, included the loss of one EC-18 and one EC-135 aircraft. These changes were the result a continuation of the normal fleet adjustments which occur at Edwards as test programs change and the general test aircraft fleet is upgraded and modernized. In late 2000 all but two of the fleet had been retired, and support of the EC-18 and NKC-135 was transferred to the 418th Flight Test Squadron on 1 October; the 452d being inactivated.

YAL-1 Airborne Laser Aircraft

In December 2002, the 452d FLTS received the YAL-1 Airborne Laser Aircraft, a modified Boeing 747-400F freighter. In July 2002, the modified aircraft took the first of a series of test flights. After receiving airworthiness certification, the aircraft was flown to Edwards Air Force Base, California, in December 2002, for the installation of systems. As part of the YAL-1 program, a detachment (Det 2) was established at Kitland AFB, New Mexico. The YAL-1A, newly painted in Air Force gray, complete with tail number 00-0001 signifying it is the first new military aircraft of the millennium, made more than a dozen flights demonstrating its airworthiness and proving its emergence as a budding weapon system. With only its computers and infrared heat sensors aboard, it successfully tracked a ballistic missile launched from Vandenberg AFB, Calif., from cloud-break to burnout, confirming it could carry out the first part of its mission.

The aircraft returned to airworthiness flight testing in December 2004 following installation of the beam control / fire control system.

In November 2004, all six modules of the COIL laser were successfully fired for the first time. In August 2005, the ABL completed a series of flight tests demonstrating the performance of the beam and flight control systems. The BILL laser was delivered in January 2006. Flight testing of the YAL-1 was transferred to the 417th Flight Test Squadron in March 2006.

RQ-4 Global Hawk UAV
The squadron began flight testing for the RQ-4 Global Hawk UAV in 2006, starting with the RQ-4A Block 10.  Subsequently, the unit has tested RQ-4B Blocks 20, 30, 40, and has tested the NATO RQ-4D and Korea and Japan RQ-4 variants.

Lineage
 Constituted as the 452d Bombardment Squadron (Medium) on 1 June 1942
 Activated on 17 July 1942
 Redesignated 452d Bombardment Squadron, Medium on 9 October 1944
 Inactivated on 12 December 1945
 Redesignated 452d Bombardment Squadron, Light on 3 July 1947
 Activated in the Reserve on 9 August 1947
 Inactivated on 27 June 1949
 Redesignated 452d Fighter-Day Squadron on 24 March 1954
 Activated on 1 July 1954
 Inactivated on 18 November 1957
 Redesignated 452d Flying Training Squadron on 28 July 1972
 Activated on 1 April 1973
 Inactivated on 31 May 1993
 Redesignated 452d Test Squadron on 31 August 1993
 Activated on 1 October 1993
 Redesignated 452d Flight Test Squadron on 1 March 1994

Assignments
 322d Bombardment Group, 17 July 1942 – 12 December 1945
 322d Bombardment Group, 9 August 1947 – 27 June 1949
 322d Fighter-Day Group, 1 July 1954 – 18 November 1957
 323d Flying Training Wing, 1 April 1973
 323d Operations Group, 15 December 1991 – 31 May 1993
 412th Operations Group, 1 October 1993 – Present

Stations
 MacDill Field, Florida, 17 July 1942
 Drane Field, Florida, 22 September-15 November 1942
 RAF Rattlesden (AAF-126), England, 1 December 1942
 RAF Bury St Edmunds (Rougham) (AAF-468), England, 22 March 1943
 RAF Andrews Field (Great Saling) (AAF-485), England, 12 June 1943
 Beauvais/Tille Airfield (A-61), France, c. 29 September 1944
 Le Culot Airfield (A-89), Belgium, c. 26 March 1945
 AAF Station Wickenrode, Germany, June 1945
 AAF Station Hornel, Germany, July 1945
 Clastres Airfield, France, c. 1 October-3 December 1945
 Camp Myles Standish, Massachusetts, 11–12 December 1945
 Reading Army Air Field (later Reading Municipal Airport), Pennsylvania, 9 August 1947 – 27 June 1949
 Foster Air Force Base, Texas, 1 July 1954 – 18 November 1957
 Deployed to Landstuhl Air Base, West Germany, 20 September-4 October 1956
 Mather Air Force Base, California, 1 April 1973 – 31 May 1993
 Edwards Air Force Base, California, 1 October 1993–present

Aircraft 

 B-26 Marauder, 1942–1945
 AT-6 Texan, 1947–1949
 AT-7 Navigator, 1947–1949
 AT-11 Kansan, 1947–1949
 F-86 Sabre, 1954–1955
 F-100 Super Sabre, 1955–1957

 T-29 Flying Classroom, 1973–1975
 T-43 Bobcat, 1973–1993
 EC-18B Advanced Range Instrumentation Aircraft, 1994-2001
 EC-135E Advanced Range Instrumentation Aircraft, 1994-2001
 Boeing YAL-1, 2002-2006
 RQ-4 Global Hawk, 2006–Present

See also

 List of United States Air Force test squadrons

References
 Notes

Bibliography

 Freeman, Roger A. UK Airfields of the Ninth, Then and Now. London: Battle of Britain Publications, 1994.
 
 
 
 
 

452
Military units and formations in California